Behind the 8 Ball is an album by organist Baby Face Willette recorded in 1964 and released on the Argo label.

Reception

Allmusic awarded the album 3 stars stating "Again, it's not quite as good as his Blue Notes (with their stellar supporting casts), but for a look at Willette's roots, Behind the 8-Ball is a solid acquisition, and worth tracking down for devotees". Douglas Payne reviewed the rerelease for All About Jazz stating "Behind the 8 Ball smokes some of the hottest, grooviest organ jazz imaginable - and catches Willette at his very best. This stuff hits heavier than any of the well-rehearsed music Willette recorded for Blue Note".

Track listing 
All compositions by Roosevelt "Baby Face" Willette except as indicated
 "Behind the 8 Ball" - 2:22   
 "Song of the Universe" - 7:08   
 "Amen" (Traditional) - 2:34   
 "Tacos Joe" - 3:14   
 "Roll 'Em Pete" (Pete Johnson, Big Joe Turner) - 3:30   
 "Just a Closer Walk with Thee" (Traditional) - 7:00   
 "St. James Infirmary" (Traditional) - 2:24   
 "Sinnin' Sam" (Stix Hooper) - 4:25

Personnel 
Baby Face Willette - organ
Ben White - guitar
Jerold Donavon - drums

References 

1965 albums
Argo Records albums
Baby Face Willette albums
Albums produced by Esmond Edwards